Blackwing or Black Wings may refer to:

Entertainment
Black Wings (film), a 1963 Polish film

Fictional characters
Blackwing (character), the name of two fictional Marvel Comics supervillains and one hero
Blackwing, one of the characters of The Order of the Stick webcomic

Music
Blackwing (song), from the CSS album Donkey
Black Wings (album), by Wolf
Blackwing Studios, an English recording studio

Vehicular
Blackwing Sweden Blackwing, a Swedish ultralight and light-sport aircraft from Blackwing Sweden
Cadillac twin-turbo V8 (aka "Blackwing")
AeroVironment Blackwing, a miniature United States Navy unmanned aerial vehicle used for ISR and communications.

Other
Blackwing 602, a classic pencil
EHC Black Wings Linz, Austrian hockey team

See also
Black Wings of Destiny, the second studio album by the Black metal band Dragonlord